My Other Home, also known as Another Shot, is a 2017 Chinese-American sports biographical film directed by Larry Yang and produced by Huang Jianxin, starring American basketball player Stephon Marbury as himself, focusing on his days in China playing in the Chinese Basketball Association (CBA). The film is mainly based on Marbury's 2011–12 CBA championship run, when he and the Beijing Ducks bested seven-time champion Guangdong Southern Tigers and brought the city of Beijing its first ever CBA title.

Filming began on April 26, 2016 in Beijing's LeSports Center. The film was released in China on 4 August 2017.

Marbury won Best New Actor at the 14th China Movie Channel Media Awards. The film is generally well-received by viewers but flopped at the Chinese box office, with a domestic gross total of only ¥8.9 million.

Plot
Stephon Marbury, after his fall from grace in the National Basketball Association and subsequent depression, rediscovers himself in the Chinese Basketball Association. He also tries to rebuild the Beijing Ducks' dynasty.

Cast
Stephon Marbury as himself
Allen Iverson as Marbury's friend who was also drafted in the 1996 NBA draft, and also grew up in a poor neighborhood.
Baron Davis as Corban Smith, import for the Guangdong team.
Jessica Jung as Yang Chen, Marbury's manager/agent
Wu Chun as Li Nan, Chinese scout that offered Marbury the Chinese contract and translated for both him and Yang Chen, as her Chinese is basic. He has to give up playing sports due to heart problems.
Godfrey Gao as Yang Xiya (based on Ji Zhe), new power forward to the Beijing Team via free agency, but he has no interest in playing with the team.
Sunny Wang as Wang Lielin, Captain of Guangdong team and also the translator for the coach.
Gao Yunxiang as bar owner, he can talk about basketball, but can't play
Vivian Dawson as Zhang Yi, Captain of Beijing Ducks
He Bing as Zheng Alei, Head Coach of Beijing Ducks 
Frankie Faison as Marbury's father
Loretta Devine as Marbury's mother 
Wang Qingxiang as Zheng Zhishang, father of Zheng Alei, and former championship-winning head coach of Beijing Team. 
Antwann Cosey as Richardson, another import for Beijing Ducks 
Andrew Manning as high school Marbury

References

External links

Chinese basketball films
Chinese biographical films
Chinese multilingual films
American multilingual films
Films set in Beijing
Films shot in Beijing
2017 films
American biographical films
2010s biographical films
Films directed by Larry Yang
Biographical films about sportspeople
Cultural depictions of basketball players
2010s American films